The communion of saints (Latin: , Ancient Greek: , koinōníā tôn Hagíōn), when referred to persons, is the spiritual union of the members of the Christian Church, living and the dead, but excluding the damned. They are all part of a single "mystical body", with Christ as the head, in which each member contributes to the good of all and shares in the welfare of all.

The earliest known use of this term to refer to the belief in a mystical bond uniting both the living and the dead in a confirmed hope and love is by Saint Nicetas of Remesiana (c. 335–414); the term has since then played a central role in formulations of the Christian creed. Belief in the communion of saints is affirmed in the Apostles' Creed.

The word "sanctorum" in the phrase "communio sanctorum" can also be understood as referring not to holy persons, but to holy things, namely the blessings that the holy persons share with each other, including their faith, the sacraments and the other spiritual graces and gifts they have as Christians.

History 

The New Testament word ἅγιος (hagios) translated into English as "saint" can refer to Christians, who,  whatever their personal sanctity as individuals, are called holy because they are consecrated to God and Christ. This usage of the word "saints" is found some fifty times in the New Testament.

And the Catechism of the Catholic Church states: "'Since all the faithful form one body, the good of each is communicated to the others.... We must therefore believe that there exists a communion of goods in the Church. But the most important member is Christ, since he is the head.... Therefore, the riches of Christ are communicated to all the members, through the sacraments.' 'As this Church is governed by one and the same Spirit, all the goods she has received necessarily become a common fund.'"

The persons who are linked in this communion include those who have died and whom  pictures as a cloud of witnesses encompassing Christians on earth. In the same chapter,  says Christians on earth "have come to Mount Zion, and to the city of the living God, the heavenly Jerusalem, and to innumerable angels in festal gathering, and to the assembly of the firstborn who are enrolled in heaven, and to a judge who is God of all, and to the spirits of just men made perfect."

Western Christianity

Roman Catholic Church 
In Catholic terminology, the communion of saints exists in the three states of the Church, the Churches Militant, Penitent, and Triumphant. The Church Militant consisting of those alive on earth; the Church Penitent consisting of those undergoing purification in purgatory in preparation for heaven; and the Church Triumphant consisting of those already in heaven.  The damned are not a part of the communion of saints.

Christians belonging to the Roman Catholic Church ask the intercession of saints in heaven, whose prayers are seen as helping their fellow Christians on earth (cf. ).

According to the Catechism of the Catholic Church:

Lutheran Churches 
Martin Luther defined the phrase thus:

Lutheranism affirms that the Church Militant and Church Triumphant share a common goal and thus do pray for one another. The Book of Concord, the official compendium of Lutheran doctrine teaches:

"... we know that the ancients speak of prayer for the dead, which we do not prohibit; but we disapprove of the application ex opere operato of the Lord's Supper on behalf of the dead."

The largest Lutheran denomination in the United States, the Evangelical Lutheran Church in America, "remembers the faithful departed in the Prayers of the People every Sunday, including those who have recently died and those commemorated on the church calendar of saints". In Funeral rites of the Evangelical Lutheran Church, "deceased are prayed for" using "commendations: 'keep our sister/brother ... in the company of all your saints. And at the last ... raise her/him up to share with all the faithful the endless joy and peace won through the glorious resurrection of Christ our Lord.'" The response for these prayers for the dead in this Lutheran liturgy is the prayer of Eternal Rest: "rest eternal grant him/her, O Lord; and let light perpetual shine upon him/her".

Methodist Churches 
In Methodist theology, the communion of saints refers to the Church Militant and Church Triumphant. The Rev. Katie Shockley explains the communion of saints in the context of the Methodist sacrament of the Eucharist:

The communion of saints is celebrated in Methodism during Allhallowtide, especially on All Saints' Day.

Methodist theology affirms the "duty to observe, to pray for the Faithful Departed". John Wesley, the founder of Methodism, "taught the propriety of Praying for the Dead, practised it himself, provided Forms that others might." It affirms that the 'saints in paradise' have full access to occurrences on earth.

Anglican Communion 
The Anglican Communion holds that baptized Christians "are ‘knit together’ with them ‘in one communion and fellowship in the mystical body of [Christ]’." The Church of Ireland teaches that:

In Anglican liturgy, "worship is addressed to God alone" and the Anglican Communion "does not pray to the saints but with the saints". However, Anglicans pray for (the dead), because we still hold them in our love, and because we trust that in God's presence those who have chosen to serve him will grow in his love, until they see him as he is."

Reformed Churches 
The Westminster Confession, which articulates the Reformed faith, teaches that the communion of saints includes those united to Christ–both the living and the dead.

Eastern Christianity

Eastern Orthodoxy

Greek Orthodox Church 
In Greek Orthodoxy, "the Church is also a communion of saints, an assembly of angels and men, of the Heaven and of the earth ... divided into what is known as the Church Militant and the Church Triumphant".

The Greek Orthodox Archdiocese of America teaches that "Through the work of the Holy Trinity all Christians could be called saints; especially in the early Church as long as they were baptized in the name of the Holy Trinity, they received the Seal of the Spirit in chrismation and frequently participated in the Eucharist."

Theologians classify six categories of saints within Eastern Orthodoxy:

Oriental Orthodoxy

Armenian Orthodox Church 
The Armenian Orthodox Church understands the communion of saints to have a twofold sense: "first, of the union of members of the Church with the Head Christ; and, secondly, of the mutual help and support of these same members in obtaining enjoying, and preserving the common good things or graces of the Church."

Comparison of views 
Roman Catholic, Lutheran, Methodist and Orthodox churches practice  praying for the dead (as they interpret ). Reformed Churches do not pray for the dead. The Anglican tradition has been ambivalent about prayers for the dead historically, sometimes embracing and other times rejecting the practice.

With regard to the various views held about the communion of saints, the Catholic Encyclopedia of 1908 wrote:

See also 

 Allhallowtide
 Communion (Christian)
 Incorruptibility
 Invisible Church
 "When the Saints Go Marching In"

References

Further reading 
The Communion of Saints - A Statement of Evangelicals and Catholics Together
Encyclopædia Britannica Online: Communion of Saints
Church of Ireland (Anglican): The Communion of Saints
Claude Beaufort Moss, THE CHRISTIAN FAITH: AN INTRODUCTION TO  DOGMATIC THEOLOGY, The Communion of Saints
First Reformed Presbyterian Church, Cambridge, Massachusetts: Sermon Notes - Communion of Saints

Ecclesiology
 
Christian terminology